Hugh C. Howey (born 1975) is an American writer, known best for the science fiction series Silo, part of which he published independently through Amazon.com's Kindle Direct Publishing system. Howey was raised in Monroe, North Carolina and before publishing his books, he worked as a book store clerk, yacht captain, roofer, and audio technician.

Wool
He began the series in 2011, initially writing Wool as a stand-alone short story. His first book was initially published with a small press. After that, he decided to publish through Amazon.com's Kindle Direct Publishing system, because of the freedom of self-publishing. After the series grew in popularity, he began to write more entries for it. Howey began soliciting international rights in 2012, including signing a deal for Brazil. Film rights to the series were sold to 20th Century Fox; Lionsgate also expressed interest.

In 2012, Howey signed a deal with Simon & Schuster to distribute Wool to book retailers across the US and Canada. The deal allowed Howey to continue to sell the book online exclusively. He notably turned down seven figure offers in favor of a mid-six figure sum, in return for maintaining e-book rights.

He has also signed publishing contracts with Random House Century UK for UK distribution of both his Wool and Sand series, published as novels of the same names.

Howey became closely tied to both Amazon/Kindle Direct Publishing and self-publishing as a leader of the new paradigm of publishing. He opened up his Silo Saga to other authors, formalizing that effort when he signed with Kindle Worlds. Though authors like Fredric Shernoff (Atlantic Island), Jason Gurley (Eleanor), and Michael Bunker (Pennsylvania) all experienced some degree of success that can be attributed to Howey, Wool, and the Kindle Worlds project, nobody was able to replicate Wools success either through tie-in books or those authors' original stories.

Personal life

In mid-2015, Howey gave up his home in Florida, and moved to St Francis Bay, Eastern Cape, South Africa. He commissioned the construction of a sailing catamaran, on which he plans to live and sail the world while he continues to write. Howey has been an avid disc golfer since 1993.

Bibliography

Novels and novellas
 Half Way Home (May 1, 2010)
 The Hurricane (May 9, 2011)
 I, Zombie (August 15, 2012)
 The Shell Collector (December 14, 2014)

The Bern Saga
 Molly Fyde and the Parsona Rescue (August 22, 2009)
 Molly Fyde and the Land of Light (January 1, 2010)
 Molly Fyde and the Blood of Billions (June 1, 2010)
 Molly Fyde and the Fight for Peace (October 27, 2010)
 Molly Fyde and the Darkness Deep (TBA)

The Sand Chronicles
 The Belt of the Buried Gods (December 15, 2013)
 Out of No Man's Land (December 19, 2013)
 Return to Danvar (December 26, 2013)
 Thunder Due East (December 27, 2013)
 A Rap Upon Heaven's Gate (January 5, 2014)
 Across the Sand (October 4, 2022)

Silo series
 Wool (July 30, 2011)
 Wool: Proper Gauge (November 30, 2011)
 Wool: Casting Off (December 4, 2011)
 Wool: The Unraveling (December 25, 2011)
 Wool: The Stranded (January 14, 2012)
 First Shift: Legacy (April 14, 2012)
 Second Shift: Order (November 20, 2012)
 Third Shift: Pact (January 28, 2013)
 Dust (August 17, 2013)

Silo series short stories
These are part of The Apocalypse Triptych collection of short stories.
 In the Air from The End is Nigh (March 1, 2014)
 In the Mountains from The End is Now (September 1, 2014)
 In the Woods from The End Has Come (March 1, 2015)

Beacon 23 series

 Beacon 23: Part One: Little Noises (June 8, 2015)
 Beacon 23: Part Two: Pet Rocks (July 5, 2015)
 Beacon 23: Part Three: Bounty (July 19, 2015)
 Beacon 23: Part Four: Company (July 26, 2015)
 Beacon 23: Part Five: Visitor (August 8, 2015)

Short stories

 The Plagiarist (February 24, 2011)
 The Walk Up Nameless Ridge (September 4, 2012)
 Promises of London (May 26, 2014)
 Glitch (June 16, 2014)
 Second Suicide (July 17, 2014)
 The Box (May 22, 2015)
 Machine Learning (October 3, 2017)

Children's books
 Misty: The Proud Cloud (November 18, 2014), Illustrated by Nidhi Chanani

Collected editions
 Wool Omnibus Edition (Wool 1-5) (January 25, 2012)
 Shift Omnibus Edition (Shift 1-3) (January 27, 2013)
 Sand Omnibus Edition (Sand 1-5) (January 9, 2014)
 The Wool Trilogy (complete Silo Series) (February 20, 2014)
 Beacon 23: The Complete Novel (Beacon 23, 1-5) (September 6, 2015)

Nonfiction
 Wayfinding Part 1: Rats and Rafts (June 27, 2015)
 Wayfinding Part 2: Hell and Heaven (July 2, 2015)
 Wayfinding - Food and Fitness (July 3, 2015)
 Wayfinding Part 3: Hot & Cold (July 5, 2015)
 Wayfinding Part 4: Old World & New (July 12, 2015)
 Wayfinding Part 5: Consciousness and Subconsciousness (July 27, 2015)
 Wayfinding Part 6: Highs and Lows (August 27, 2015)

As editor
 The End is Nigh (The Apocalypse Triptych Book 1) (March 2014, with John Joseph Adams)  
 The End is Now (The Apocalypse Triptych Book 2) (September 2014, with John Joseph Adams)
 The End Has Come (The Apocalypse Triptych Book 3) (May 2015, with John Joseph Adams)

Interviews

 How Bestselling Author Hugh Howey Writes - Copyblogger - August 2015
 Winning at the Self-publishing Game with Hugh Howey

Filmography

Television

Wool

Production on the serialization of Wool was announced in 2012. After development was begun by AMC, the project was moved to Apple TV+ in May of 2021.

Beacon 23

In 2018 it was announced that the Beacon 23 series was going to be adapted into a television series. Filming began in 2022

References

External links
 

 

21st-century American novelists
American science fiction writers
Living people
1975 births
American male novelists
American male short story writers
Place of birth missing (living people)
21st-century American short story writers
21st-century American male writers
Writers from Charlotte, North Carolina
Novelists from North Carolina